The Classic Army M15 series rifles are full-scale AEG replicas of the various M16-type and M4-type rifles currently in use by the United States armed forces. They are made by Classic Army.

All replicas feature metal receivers, strengthened gearsets and stiffer springs than AEG's from manufacturers such as Tokyo Marui, and also feature laser engraved "ArmaLite" trademarks, just like those found on the actual AR15 series weapons produced by ArmaLite.

M15A2

Rifle
Complete replica of the venerable ArmaLite M16A2 rifle. The only real difference in this airsoft weapon is this rifle features fully automatic fire, while the real ArmaLite M16A2 features a select fire system allowing semiautomatic or 3-round burst. Accepts large batteries.

Carbine
Carbine version of the above rifle, featuring cut-down  barrel and collapsible stock, much like the M4A1. Accepts small batteries.

Tactical Carbine
As the standard carbine, but with the rifle's large stock in order to accommodate large batteries.

M15A4

Rifle
Full-size replica of the current-issue M16A4 assault rifle. Features removable rearsight assembly, revealing a 20mm rail for mounting optics. As with the A2 version, this rifle accepts large batteries.

Carbine
Full-size replica of the M4A1 assault rifle. Accepts small batteries.

Tactical Carbine
Same as M15A4 Rifle, but with Carbine barrel and hand guard assembly

RIS
As standard Carbine, but equipped with a replica Rail Integration System for mounting extra accessories, such as flashlights, grenade launchers, etc. Comes with an external battery box which accepts larger batteries than usual.

SPC
Special Purpose Carbine; this rifle is essentially the RIS model with a full stock for accepting large batteries.

SPR
Special Purpose Rifle; this rifle is essentially an M15A4 rifle with a full-length RIS, forward pistol grip and Lewis Machine & Tool rearsight. Accepts large batteries.

This model also features a 7 mm gearbox, giving higher out-the-box performance in terms of muzzle velocity and rate of fire.

CQB
This is a full-size replica of the Mk18 Mod0 Subcompact Assault Rifle in use by USSOCOM. It features a cut-down, 10.5-inch barrel, RIS, Lewis Machine & Tool rearsight and a Crane stock, which accepts large custom batteries.

This model also has a 7

CQB Compact
A variant of the CQB, this features a shorter (sub-10-inch) barrel, custom RIS and flip up rearsight.

CQB SEALS Compact
A variant of the CQB, this features a removable frontsight in addition to the original "Compact"'s features.

See also
 Classic Army

Sources
 Classic Army's website

Airsoft
Airsoft guns